The Breccaschlund is a karstic plain with primeval forest, located above the lake Schwarzsee, in the Swiss Canton of Fribourg.

The area was created by glaciers in the last ice age.
Despite the usage as alpine pastures and despite the popularity among hikers, the area continues to be home to a variety of alpine flowers and alpine animals.

The Breccaschlund can be reached by car and public transport, and subsequently by the cable car Schwarzsee-Riggisalp.

External links 

 Schwarzsee.ch (in English, German, and French) tourism information.

Landforms of the canton of Fribourg